The Equator-S satellite was a spacecraft constructed by the Max Planck Institute for Extraterrestrial Physics for the International Solar-Terrestrial Physics Science Initiative. It was operational between 2 December 1997 and 1 May 1998.

Description 
Equator-S was a low-cost mission, launched with the intention to study the Earth's magnetosphere around the equator at heights lower than 67,000 km. It was located in a near-equatorial orbit, which gave Equator-S the ability to make unique observations about the interaction between the magnetosphere and interplanetary space. Equator-S had a very high spin rate and was launched on an Ariane 4 rocket on 2 December 1997.

The mission ended earlier than expected, having initially been intended to have a lifetime of two years. The mission was terminated on 1 May 1998 after the failure of the onboard processor system.

See also 

 List of heliophysics missions

References 

Spacecraft launched in 1997